The Irish Naturalists' Journal is a scientific journal covering all aspects of natural history. It has been published since 1925. It was predecessed by The Irish Naturalist (1892−1924).

References

External links 

The Irish Naturalist (1892−1924) in Biodiversity Heritage Library

Biology journals
Publications established in 1925